A family called Salviati were glass makers and mosaicists in Murano, Venice and also in London, working as the firm Salviati, Jesurum & Co. of 213 Regent Street, London; also as  Salviati and Co. and later (after 1866) as the Venice and Murano Glass and Mosaic Company (Today Pauly & C. - Compagnia Venezia Murano).

History
In World War II, the Salviati building on the Grand Canal in Venice was occupied by the Nazis and used as a Nazi Headquarters.  The Camerino family fled the Holocaust to various locations throughout the world including the UK, USA, Israel, and South Africa. In 1898, the company's new London premises at 235 Regent Street (now the Apple Store) incorporated a set of mosaic armorials along the façade, which are still visible today and were restored in 1999.

The company was founded by Dr Antonio Salviati, a lawyer from Vicenza in Northern Italy.

In 1971, the House of Salviati collaborated with the Laurel Lamp Company to produce original Murano art glass sculptures employed in table lamps which were featured at the Los Angeles Furnishings Mart. 

The company was later acquired in 1999 by the French glassmaker that would later be known as Arc International.

Mosaics
Many famous mosaics were made by Salviate, and the company's various historical name changes are well documented
	
the Central Lobby of the House of Parliament (Palace of Westminster), London	
the Paris Opera House
the Albert Memorial
Westminster's Altar Screen
Westminster Cathedral
the Council House, Birmingham
the Chamberlain Memorial, Birmingham.
St David's Cathedral in Wales.
St Paul's Cathedral, London
Ajuda National Palace, Lisbon.

References

External links

The mosaics above the high altar in St David's Cathedral, Wales
Detail from the above – St David's Cathedral
Mosaic arms of Venice on the outside of the Apple Store, Regent Street, London
Salviati
Official Site of Pauly & C. | CVM – Compagnia Venezia Murano

Venetian glass
Glassmaking companies of England
Glassmaking companies of Italy
Manufacturing companies based in London